The Royal Enfield Himalayan is an adventure touring motorcycle manufactured by Royal Enfield. It was revealed in February 2015 and launched in early 2016. Pierre Terblanche led the design team during Himalayan's development.

Model history 
The Himalayan was conceived by CEO Siddhartha Lal, as an adventure touring, or dual sport motorcycle. The Himalayan differs considerably from the other motorcycles offered by Royal Enfield - most of which are various incarnations of the Bullet utilising the same frame and engine - in terms of its chassis and powertrain. Pierre Terblanche, formerly of Ducati and Moto Guzzi among other companies, headed Royal Enfield's design team during development of the Himalayan.

An early prototype was made in mid-2014, followed by a more complete version in 2015. The vehicle was released in India in early 2016, followed by a release in international markets such as Philippines, Australia and the United Kingdom later that year. Both domestic and export model now gets  Electronic Fuel Injection and ABS as standard.

The 2021 model  got significant upgrades like tripper navigation powered by Google maps (same unit offered in new meteor 350) and redesigned Jerry can Holder.

Upon its introduction, the Himalayan was praised for its good suspension and off-road ability, while some criticism was directed to the relatively low power output of the engine. The motorcycle also has longer intervals between servicing and oil changes.

The early Himalayan suffered some production issues. It was noted that the quality of parts was not up to the mark and in 2017 some users filed lawsuits to either demand compensation or return the bike for refund. The company responded and in 2018 it was reported that "Royal Enfield is taking proactive steps to ensure the quality of its adventure motorcycle, the Royal Enfield Himalayan, both in the domestic and in the international markets."

Design

Engine 
The Himalayan's engine was designed and produced by Royal Enfield from the ground-up and shares little to no parts with other contemporaries in the company's line-up. The engine, named the LS410 indicating its long-stroke ratio, is a unit-construction 411 cc single-cylinder, oil-cooled 4-stroke SOHC engine. The motor generates a power output of 24.5 bhp at 6,500 rpm (18.02 KW) and a maximum torque of 32 Nm at 4,000-4,500 rpm. The engine also includes an oil cooler, a first among motorcycles manufactured by Royal Enfield India. The bike employs electronic fuel injection and the engine is mated to a 5-speed constant mesh transmission.

This engine has a single overhead camshaft, thereby moving away from the traditional pushrod design that had been used by the company from 1955, starting with the original Bullet up to the contemporary Classic series.

Frame and chassis 
The Himalayan has a half-duplex split cradle frame. Suspension is telescopic in the front while the rear is provided with monoshock suspension.  Front forks are 41 mm with 200 mm of travel and the rear suspension offers 180 mm of travel. The motorcycle has a ground clearance of 220 mm.

Factory standard tyres measure 90/90 21-inch at the front and 120/90 17-inch at the rear. These are manufactured by CEAT. For units sold in the UK and  North America, the tyres are manufactured by Pirelli (MT-60).

The motorcycle has a 300 mm disc with a dual piston floating caliper at the front and a 240 mm single piston caliper disc at rear.

The instrumentation console for this motorcycle is also modeled anew. It includes an analog speedometer and tachometer, with a digital display for the odometer, gear position indicator, trip-meter and Ambient temperature gauge. Also included is an analog fuel gauge and a digital compass. Also included is a windscreen, which can be manually adjusted for height via screws to two positions. 

The motorcycle was designed specifically with touring in mind and features an upright seating position, with a seat height of 800 mm, allowing the rider to be seated relatively low compared to the overall height of the motorcycle. The motorcycle also features mounts on either sides of the tank, which can serve as holders for jerrycans, as well as tank guards. The rear includes a luggage carrier, and mounts are also provided as well to install aluminium panniers both provided by Royal Enfield as accessories.

References

Motorcycles of India
Himalayan